Era (styled as +eRa+) is a new-age music project by French composer Eric Lévi. Some of the lyrics were written by Guy Protheroe in an imaginary language similar to Latin, but deliberately devoid of any exact meaning. Musically, the project blends Gregorian chants with modern elements and genres, especially rock, pop and electronic music.

Era’s first album, Era, was released in 1996 and became a worldwide success, helped by its first single, "Ameno". It sold over 6 million copies and became the most exported French album at the time. It was followed by Era 2 in 2000 and The Mass in 2003. In 2008, the project saw a significant departure from its previous themes and presented a more electronic soundscape with Arabic influences in its fourth album, Reborn. In the following two years, Era released Classics and Classics 2, which consisted in contemporary reinterpretations of classical works by Johann Sebastian Bach, Giuseppe Verdi, Antonio Vivaldi, Wolfgang Amadeus Mozart, Ludwig van Beethoven and Pyotr Ilyich Tchaikovsky, amongst others. In 2013, Era released an album in collaboration with French singer and actress Arielle Dombasle entitled Arielle Dombasle by Era and, in 2017 an album titled The 7th Sword.

Style

Era mixes Gregorian chants and occasionally world music with contemporary electronic and pop-rock arrangements. It is reminiscent of new-age music projects such as Enigma, Gregorian, and Deep Forest. Lyrics are written in Latin and  English and, some are based on beliefs of the 13th century French heretics, the Cathars.

Era's live shows and music videos often feature artists dressed in medieval or traditional clothes and armour. Usually, actors Pierre Bouisierie and Irene Bustamante perform at Era shows.

Language
Most Era songs are sung in an imaginary language inspired by Latin, but with no intended meaning, while others are in actual Latin. They also have some songs in English such as "Mother" and "Looking For Something" and, in Arabic, such as "7 Seconds".

Use of Era's music
 Eric Levi composed the soundtrack for the French comedy film Les Visiteurs (1993) and Les Visiteurs II (1998). The film score would later become part of an Era album.
 The song "Divano" was part of the soundtrack of the Brazilian soap opera Um Anjo Caiu do Céu (2001). Also used as 2000 Kia Optima commercial in South Korea.
 The song "I Believe" was recorded as a duet by Katherine Jenkins and Andrea Bocelli. It was released on both Jenkins' 2009 album Believe and Bocelli's 2009 album My Christmas.
 Era is famous among mixed martial arts fans due to "Enae Volare Mezzo" being the theme song of Fedor Emelianenko. "Ameno" is used by Fedor's younger brother, Aleksander Emelianenko, and used by Mexican wrestler Myzteziz
 "Mother" was used in Sylvester Stallone's sports drama Driven.
 The song "Ameno" has, of December 2019, been used in variations of the doge meme.
The song "Ameno" is used in many TikTok videos joking about the name of Elon Musk and Grimes' child X Æ A-Xii.

Discography

Studio albums

Compilation albums

Singles and EPs

Double albums

Bootleg albums

References

External links

 
 

New-age music groups
French world music groups
French electronic music groups
Musical groups established in 1996